Ben Kelso (born April 11, 1949) is an American former National Basketball Association (NBA) player for the Detroit Pistons. He has coached basketball for schools in the Detroit area and was accused and acquitted of an alleged scandal in this capacity. In July, 2005, the Kansas State Wildcats hired Kelso as assistant coach for their men's basketball program.

Kelso, a graduate of Central Michigan University, was drafted by Coach Ray Scott and the Pistons (in the 8th rounds of both 1972 and 1973 drafts), where he played from 1973-1974. In 1976, Kelso was hired by Scott as one of his assistant coaches at Eastern Michigan University. Over three seasons, he helped guide EMU to a 29-52 record. EMU fired Scott and his staff in March 1979.

After retiring as a professional ball player, Kelso began coaching students at various schools.  At Detroit's Cooley High School, where he coached for 14 years, Kelso lead the team to three (3) consecutive state championships in 1987, 1988, and 1989, which led to his appearance in the March 5, 1990 edition of Sports Illustrated 

In 1998, Kelso transferred over to Southfield High School as coach and athletic director where he was credited with rejuvenating the girls' basketball program and winning two state championships.

On December 17, 2002, Kelso was fired by the Southfield Board of Education after being accused of allegedly misappropriating funds from school ticket and concession sales. Police and the District Attorneys Office concluded that there was insufficient evidence to arrest Kelso. 18 months later, the State Tenure Commission concluded that Kelso was wrongfully terminated and advised him to resume his job.

Kelso ultimately took a new job as gym instructor with Southfield's Arthur Ashe Academy after Southfield High School officials refused to speak with him and later refused to reissue his original job title. Kelso later became the head coach at Mumford High School.

On April 29, 2013, Kelso was offered and accepted the head coach position for the varsity boys' basketball team at Waterford Kettering High School in Waterford, Michigan. After leaving for one season at Waterford Kettering, he took the same position over at Pontiac High School. He also periodically conducts his own basketball training program for youth, collegiate and professionals players in Michigan

References
 Ben Kelso moves over to Arthur Ashe school, The Southfield Jay (October 17, 2004)
 Kansas State hires Ben Kelso
 Ben Kelso's Fundamental Basketball Training

External links
 Ben Kelso NBA profile provided by basketballreference.com

1949 births
Living people
African-American basketball players
American men's basketball coaches
American men's basketball players
Basketball coaches from Michigan
Basketball players from Flint, Michigan
Central Michigan Chippewas men's basketball players
Detroit Pistons draft picks
Detroit Pistons players
Eastern Michigan Eagles men's basketball coaches
High school basketball coaches in Michigan
Kansas State Wildcats men's basketball coaches
Shooting guards
Sportspeople from Flint, Michigan
Sportspeople from Southfield, Michigan
21st-century African-American people
20th-century African-American sportspeople